Ambuphylline (or bufylline) is a combination of theophylline and aminoisobutanol used as a bronchodilator. It also acts and may be used as a diuretic.

References

Xanthines